Puli Bridge is a suspension bridge near Xuanwei, Qujing, China. The bridge forms part of the G56 Hangzhou–Ruili Expressway between Liupanshui and Xuanwei and was opened in August 2015. The bridge and associated expressway reduced the travelling time from Xuanwei to the Guizhou border from four hours to one hour. The bridge crosses a small stream beside the Gexiang River gorge.

Design and construction
The bridge cost 440 million yuan (about US$71 million). Similar to the Sidu River Bridge,  the first cable used to erect the span (the pilot cable) was placed using a rocket.

Notes

References

Bridges in Yunnan
Suspension bridges in China
Transport in Qujing